David Bowie (1947–2016) was an English musician and actor. Throughout his career, he won 49 awards from a total of 113 nominations.

He began his singing career under the name David Bowie in 1966 and won his first award in 1969, when he won an Ivor Novello Award for the song "Space Oddity". Bowie's first hit album was Hunky Dory in 1971 which reached number three in the UK Albums Chart. Despite his next eleven studio albums all making the UK Top 10—including four number one albums—he did not receive any more music awards or nominations until the early 1980s. He has since won numerous awards for his music, including: four BRIT Awards—Best British Male Solo Artist at the 1984 and 2014 BRIT Awards, an Outstanding Contribution Award at the 1996 BRIT Awards and an Icon Award at the 2016 Brit Awards which was awarded to him posthumously; six Grammy Awards including Best Video, Short Form for the David Bowie video at the 1985 Grammy Awards and a Lifetime Achievement Award at the 2006 Grammy Awards; and four MTV Video Music Awards—Best Male Video for "China Girl" and a Video Vanguard Award at the 1984 MTV Video Music Awards, Best Overall Performance in a Video for "Dancing in the Street" at the 1986 MTV Video Music Awards, and Best Art Direction for "Blackstar" at the 2016 MTV Video Music Awards.

Bowie began his acting career in the 1967 short film The Image. His first leading role was in the 1976 science fiction film The Man Who Fell to Earth, a role for which he won a Saturn Award for Best Actor at the 1976 Saturn Awards. He has also had an innovative presence on the Internet which led to his being awarded a lifetime achievement Webby Award in 2007 for "pushing the boundaries of art and technology with his digital empire".

AMFT Awards 

!Ref.
|-
| rowspan=3|2016
| David Bowie
| Lifetime Achievement Award
| 
| rowspan=3|
|-
| rowspan=2|"Blackstar"
| Best Rock Song
| 
|-
| Best Rock Solo Performance
|

American Music Awards 
The American Music Awards are awarded for outstanding achievements in the music industry. Bowie has received one nomination.

BAFTA Awards 
The BAFTA Television Awards are awarded by the British Academy of Film and Television Arts. Bowie has received one nomination.

The BAFTA Interactive Entertainment Awards were awarded by the British Academy of Film and Television Arts for multimedia entertainment. Bowie has received one win.

BMI Pop Awards

!Ref.
|-
| 1999
| "Heroes"
| Award-Winning Song
| 
|

Billboard Music Awards 
The Billboard Music Awards are held to honour artists for commercial performance in the U.S., based on record charts published by Billboard.

Sweden GAFFA Awards
Delivered since 2010, the GAFFA Awards (Swedish: GAFFA Priset) are a Swedish award that rewards popular music awarded by the magazine of the same name.

!
|-
| 2013
| Himself
| Best Foreign Solo Act
| 
| style="text-align:center;" |
|-
|}

Golden Globe Awards 
The Golden Globe Awards are awarded by the Hollywood Foreign Press Association in the United States. Bowie has received one nomination.

GQ Awards 
The GQ Award is an annual awards ceremony founded by the men's magazine GQ. Bowie has received one award from one nomination.

|-
| 2000
| David Bowie
| Most Stylish Man of the Year
|

Grammy Awards 
The Grammy Awards are awarded annually by the National Academy of Recording Arts and Sciences in the United States for outstanding achievements in the record industry. Bowie has won five competitive awards from seventeen nominations. In 2006, he received the Grammy Lifetime Achievement Award.

In addition, David Bowie's song "Sue (Or in a Season of Crime)" won the Grammy for the Best Arrangement, Instrumental and Vocals for bandleader Maria Schneider at the 58th Annual Grammy Awards.

Grammy Lifetime Achievement

Hungarian Music Awards
Hungarian Music Awards is the national music awards of Hungary, held every year since 1992 and promoted by Mahasz.

|-
| 2000
| Hours
| rowspan=2|Best Foreign Rock Album
| 
|-
| 2003
| Heathen
| 
|-
| 2014
| The Next Day
| rowspan=2|Pop/Rock Album of the Year 
| 
|-
| 2017
| Blackstar
|

Ivor Novello Awards 
The Ivor Novello Awards are awarded annually by the British Academy of Composers and Songwriters to honour songwriting and composing. Bowie has won four award from five nomination. On 10 May 1970, David Bowie performed that night in awards accompanied by the Les Reed Orchestra.

Juno Awards 

The Juno Awards are presented annually to Canadian musical artists and bands to acknowledge their artistic and technical achievements in all aspects of music. New members of the Canadian Music Hall of Fame are also inducted as part of the awards ceremonies.

|-
| rowspan="2" | 1984
| Let's Dance
| International Album of the Year
|  
|-
| "Let's Dance"
| International Single of the Year
|

Mercury Prize 
The Mercury Prize is awarded by the British Phonographic Industry and the British Association of Record Dealers for the best album from the United Kingdom or Ireland. Bowie has received three nominations.

Mojo Awards 
The MOJO Awards are awarded by the British music magazine Mojo. Bowie has received four nominations.

MTV

MTV Movie Awards 
The MTV Movie Awards are awarded by the television channel MTV for best in film. Bowie has received one nomination.

MTV Video Music Awards 
The MTV Video Music Awards were established in 1984 by MTV to celebrate the top music videos of the year. Bowie has won three awards from nine nominations.

iHeartRadio Much Music Video Awards 
The iHeartRadio Much Music Video Awards are annually presented by the Canadian music video channel Much to honour the year's best music videos. Bowie has won one award from one nomination.

Music Video Production Awards 
The MVPA Awards are annually presented by a Los Angeles-based music trade organization to honor the year's best music videos.

|-
| rowspan="4" | 2013
| rowspan="4" | "The Stars (Are Out Tonight)"
| Best Hair 
| 
|-
| Best Director of a Male Artist 
| 
|-
| Best Art Direction 
| 
|-
| Best Colorist 
|

NME Awards

The NME Awards is an annual music awards show, founded by the music magazine NME, where the winners are decided by public votes. David Bowie has received eleven awards from eleven nominations.

|-
|align="center" rowspan="2" | 1973 || rowspan=13| David Bowie || World Male Singer || 
|-
| British Male Singer || 
|-
|align="center" rowspan="3" | 1974 || World Male Singer || 
|-
| British Male Singer || 
|-
| Best Producer || 
|-
|align="center" rowspan="1" | 1977 || Best Male Singer || 
|-
|align="center" rowspan="1" | 1978 || Best Male Singer || 
|-
|align="center" rowspan="1" | 1981 || Best Male Singer || 
|-
|align="center" rowspan="2" | 1983 || Best Male Singer || 
|-
| Best Dressed Male || 
|-
| 1996 || rowspan=2|Best Solo Artist || 
|-
| 2000 || 
|-
| align="center" rowspan="2" | 2013 || Hero of the Year || 
|-
| "Where Are We Now?" || Best Video || 
|-
| align="center" rowspan="2" | 2014 || David Bowie || Best Solo Artist || 
|-
| David Bowie || Hero of the Year || 
|-
|align="center" rowspan="1" | 2016 || Five Years (1969–1973) || Best Reissue || 
|-
| 2017 || David Bowie || Hero of the Year || 
|}

New Music Awards
The New Music Awards are given for excellence in music to both recording artists and radio stations by New Music Weekly magazine.

|-
| 2017
| Himself
| College Artist of the Year
|

Polstar Concert Industry Awards
The Pollstar Concert Industry Awards is an annual award ceremony to honor artists and professionals in the concert industry. 

|-
| rowspan=2|1988
| Himself
| Comeback of the Year
| 
|-
| Glass Spider Tour
| rowspan=3|Most Creative Stage Production
| 
|-
| 1991
| Sound+Vision Tour
| 
|-
| 1996
| Outside Tour (w/Nine Inch Nails)
| 
|-
| 1998
| Earthling Tour
| Small Hall Tour of the Year 
|

Porin

Q Awards 
The Q Awards are hosted annually by the British music magazine Q. Bowie has won one award from nine nominations.

Rockbjörnen 
The Rockbjörnen is a music award ceremony in Sweden, established in 1979 by the Aftonbladet, one of the largest newspapers in Nordic countries.

 
|-
| 1982 
| rowspan="2" | Himself 
| rowspan="2" | Best Foreign Artist 
|  
|-
| 1983
|

Saturn Awards 
The Saturn Awards are awarded by the Academy of Science Fiction, Fantasy & Horror Films in the United States. Bowie has won one award from one nomination.

Silver Clef Awards 
The Silver Clef Award are an annual UK music awards lunch which has been running since 1976. Bowie has received one award.

|-
| 1987
| Himself 
| Silver Celf Award
|

The Daily Californian Art Awards

!Ref.
|-
| 2016
| "★"
| Best Music Video
| 
|

UK Music Video Awards 

The UK Music Video Awards is an annual award ceremony founded in 2008 to recognise creativity, technical excellence and innovation in music videos and moving images for music. Bowie has received one award from three nominations.

|-
| rowspan="3" | 2016
| rowspan="2 | "Blackstar"
| Best Production Design 
|  
|-
| rowspan="2" | Best Rock/Indie Video
|  
|-
| "Lazarus"
|

WB Radio Music Awards 
The WB Radio Music Awards are awarded annually in the United States to honour performers and on-air radio personalities. Bowie has won one award from one nomination.

Webby Awards 
Presented by the International Academy of Digital Arts and Sciences, Webby Awards are awarded for excellence on the Internet. Bowie has won one award from one nomination.

Žebřík Music Awards 

!Ref.
|-
| rowspan=2|1996
| rowspan=3|David Bowie
| Best International Enjoyment
| 
| rowspan=2|
|-
| Best International Personality
| 
|-
| rowspan=2|1997
| Best International Male
| 
| rowspan=12|
|-
| Earthling
| rowspan=2|Best International Album
| 
|-
| rowspan=4|1999
| Hours
| 
|-
| "Thursday's Child"
| Best International Song
| 
|-
| rowspan=5|David Bowie
| rowspan=1|Best International Male
| 
|-
| rowspan=3|Best International Personality
| 
|-
| 2000
| 
|-
| rowspan=3|2002
| 
|-
| Best International Male
| 
|-
| Heathen
| Best International Album
| 
|-
| rowspan=2|2003
| rowspan=2|David Bowie
| rowspan=1|Best International Male
| 
|-
| rowspan=1|Best International Personality
| 
|-
| rowspan=2|2015
| "★"
| Best International Song
| 
| rowspan=7|
|-
| rowspan=2|David Bowie
| rowspan=2|Best International Male
| 
|-
| rowspan=5|2016
| 
|-
| The death of David Bowie
| Best International Průser
| 
|-
| ★
| Best International Album
| 
|-
| rowspan=2|"Lazarus"
| Best International Song
| 
|-
| Best International Video
|

Other honours 

Bowie's first award was at the Malta International Song Festival in July 1969 where he won best-produced record. Bowie was inducted to the Rock and Roll Hall of Fame in 1996  and received a star on the Hollywood Walk of Fame in 1997, 
which is located at 7201 Hollywood Blvd.
In 1999, Bowie was made a Commander of the Ordre des Arts et des Lettres and he received an honorary doctorate from Berklee College of Music. He has been reported to have declined the British honour Commander of the Order of the British Empire (CBE) in 2000, and a knighthood in 2003.

Bowie was inducted by the Science Fiction and Fantasy Hall of Fame in June 2013.

In September 2011, Bowie became one of several prominent local figures to feature on the Brixton Pound, a local currency that is available as an alternative to the pound sterling in the Brixton area. Bowie's face appears on the B£10 note.

The spider Heteropoda davidbowie is named in his honour and, following his death on 10 January, Cincinnati Zoo and Botanical Garden announced that the first animal born in 2016 – a blue penguin chick – would be named Bowie after the late singer.

On 5 January 2015, a few days before his 68th birthday, a main-belt asteroid was named (342843) Davidbowie in his honour. On 13 January 2016, Belgian astronomers at MIRA Public Observatory in conjunction with radio station Studio Brussels registered a new asterism of seven stars in the vicinity of Mars at the date of Bowie's death that, when connected, form the lightning bolt seen on Bowie's face on the cover of his Aladdin Sane album.

References

External links 

 
 
 

Awards
Lists of awards received by British actor
David Bowie